The 1900 Idaho gubernatorial election was held on November 6, 1900. Democratic nominee Frank W. Hunt defeated Republican nominee D. W. Standrod with 50.87% of the vote.

General election

Candidates
Major party candidates
Frank W. Hunt, Democratic
D. W. Standrod, Republican 

Other candidates
Silas Luttrell, Prohibition

Results

References

1900
Idaho
Gubernatorial